The 1964 Dwars door België was the 20th edition of the Dwars door Vlaanderen cycle race and was held on 29–30 March 1964. The race started and finished in Waregem. The race was won by Piet van Est.

General classification

References

1964
1964 in road cycling
1964 in Belgian sport